Francis Nkhoma (c. 1937 – 15 May 2009) was a Zambian politician and the former governor of the Bank of Zambia (1987-1989). He briefly served as the President of the United National Independence Party.

References

1937 births
2009 deaths
Governors of Bank of Zambia
United National Independence Party politicians
20th-century Zambian businesspeople
Members of the National Assembly of Zambia